This glossary describes the terms used in formal descriptions of spiders; where applicable these terms are used in describing other arachnids.

Links within the glossary are shown .

Terms

A

 Abdomen or opisthosoma: One of the two main body parts (tagmata), located towards the posterior end; see also Abdomen § Other animals

 Anal tubercle: A small protuberance (tubercule) above the  through which the anus opens

 Apodeme: see 

 Apophysis (plural apophyses): An outgrowth or process changing the general shape of a body part, particularly the appendages; often used in describing the male : see 

B
 Bidentate: Having two 

 Branchial operculum: see 

 Bulbus: see

C

 Caput (plural capita): see 

 Carpoblem: The principal   on the male ; also just called the tibial apophysis

 Chelate: A description of a  where the  closes against a tooth-like process

 Cheliceral tooth: A tooth-like extension on the margin of the 

 Claw: see 

 Claw tuft: A dense group of hairs or bristles (setae) underneath the paired , usually well developed in hunting spiders

 Conductor: see 

 Copulatory duct: An internal tube (duct) from the  through which sperm enters the female; separate from the duct through which fertilized eggs pass in entelegyne spiders

 Coxa: see 

 Crenulate: Having longitudinal ridges

D

 Dorsal groove: see 

E
 Ecribellate: see 

 Embolus: see 

 Endite: see 

 Endosternite: An internal hardened plate (sclerite)

 Eyes: The basic number of eyes is eight, typically arranged in two rows (e.g. as in Gnaphosidae); the front row are the anterior eyes, the row behind the posterior eyes; the four eyes to the edges are the lateral eyes, the four eyes in the centre the median eyes; the anterior median eyes are called the main eyes or direct eyes, while the other eyes are called the secondary eyes or indirect eyes; the number of eyes, their sizes and arrangement varies widely and is characteristic of spider families; see ,

F

 Femur: see 

 Folium: A broad leaf-like marking along the medial line of the top of the 

 Fossa (plural fossae): A pit or depression, typically in the 

G
 Genital opening: see 

 Gnathocoxa: see 

 Gonopore: The genital opening; located in the epigastric furrow; the opening of the duct from the uterus in females and from the testes in males; see also Gonopore

H
 Haematodocha: see 

 Heart mark: A narrow marking along the top of the  roughly corresponding to the location of the heart

 

L

 Laterigrade: With legs directed to the side, hence appearing like and moving like a crab; see 

 Leg formula: The legs are numbered from the front from I to IV; the relative length of the legs can be represented by four numbers from the longest to the shortest; e.g. 1423 = first leg (leg I) is longest and third leg (leg III) is shortest

 Leg parts or segments see 

M
 Main eye: One of the two anterior median eyes (AME) that have the light-detecting units (rhabdomeres) pointing towards the source; particularly enlarged in the families Salticidae and Thomisidae; see , 

 Mastidion (plural mastidia): A projection or bump on the chelicerae (not to be confused with )

 Metatarsus: see 

O

 Opisthosoma: see 

P
 Palp: see 

 Conductor: A part of the palpal bulb that accompanies and supports the embolus

 Embolus: The final part of the palpal bulb containing the end of the sperm duct, usually thin, sharp-tipped and strongly hardened (sclerotized)

 Haematodocha (plural haematodochae): A membranous, inflatable part of the palpal bulb

 Median apophysis: A projection (apophysis) of the palpal bulb, below the conductor

 Subtegulum: A hardened part of the palpal bulb nearer its base than the tegulum

 Tegulum: The main hardened part of the palpal bulb

 Patella: see 

 Plumose: Used to describe hairs having outgrowths or appendages on two sides, giving a feather-like appearance; the appendages vary in number, size and arrangement

 Pluridentate: Having multiple 

 Postembryo (also called larva): The stage of development between hatching from the egg and first molting

 Procurved: Used to describe a structure which is curved in such a way that the outer edges are in front of the central part; opposite 

 Prolateral: Viewed from above or below, the side of a leg or  nearest the mouth, i.e. the side facing forward; opposite  (includes diagram)

 Promarginal: The side of the  facing forward; particularly used for describing ; opposite 

 Prosoma: see 

R

 Rebordered: Having a thickened edge (i.e. border) (more rarely seen as reborded, from the French , e.g. in Levy (1984)); particularly used of the 

 Receptaculum (plural receptacula): see 

 Recurved: Used to describe a structure which is curved in such a way that the outer edges are behind the central part; opposite 

 Retrolateral: Viewed from above or below, the side of a leg or  furthest from the mouth, i.e. the side facing backwards; opposite 

 Retrolateral tibial apophysis: A backward-facing projection on the tibia of the male ; distinguishing feature of the RTA clade

 Retromarginal: The side of the  facing backward (towards the posterior end of the spider); particularly used for describing ; opposite 

S
 Scape: An elongated process or appendage of some 

 Sclerite: A single hardened (sclerotized) part of the external covering (tegument, exoskeleton)

 Scopula (plural scopulae): A brush of hairs (setae); called a  when on the end of the foot (tarsus), where it improves adhesion

 Secondary eye: An eye belonging to the three pairs – anterior lateral eyes (ALE), posterior median eyes (PME) and posterior lateral eyes (PLE) – that are primarily movement detectors and have the light-detecting units (rhabdomeres) pointing away from the source; see , 

 Segments or articles of the legs and :

 Trochanter: Second leg segment, between coxa and femur

 Femur (plural femora): Third leg segment, between trochanter and patella

 Patella (plural patellae): Fourth leg segment, between femur and tibia

 Tibia (plural tibiae): Fifth leg segment, between patella and metatarsus

 Metatarsus (plural metatarsi; also called basitarsus): Sixth leg segment, between tibia and tarsus; absent in the 

 Tarsus (plural tarsi; also called telotarsus): Seventh (last) leg segment, after the metatarsus

 Serrula: A row of tiny teeth along the edge of the 

 Seta (plural setae): A bristle; spiders have a variety of hair-like structures of increasing size that are referred to as hairs, bristles (setae) or 

 Sperm duct: A duct in the male  used to store sperm

 Spine: A pointed, rigid structure on body and legs, usually with a basal joint; spiders have a variety of hair-like structures of increasing size that are referred to as hairs, bristles (setae) or spines

 Sternum: The lower (ventral) portion of the 

 Stridulating organ: A series of thin ridges on a hardened part of the body; rubbing this with a matching series of short, stiff bristles (setae) elsewhere on the body creates a sound

 Subadult: A spider in the last stage of development (penultimate instar) before becoming a sexually mature adult

 Subtegulum: see 

T
 Tapetum (plural tapeta): A light-reflecting layer in a  making the eye appear pale

 Tarsal organ: a small pit, usually spherical and on the  surface of each , believed to respond to humidity

 Tarsus: see 

 Teeth: Pointed growths or bumps along the margins of the 

 Tegulum: see 

 Thoracic furrow: see 

 Tibia: see 

 Trachea (plural tracheae): A thin hardened internal tube, part of the respiratory system in many araneomorph spiders; opens on the underside of the  via a tracheal spiracle; see Trachea § Invertebrates

 Trochanter: see 

U
 Unidentate: Having a single tooth

V

Abbreviations
Some abbreviations commonly found in descriptions of spider anatomy include:ALE: anterior lateral eyes → ALS: anterior lateral spinnerets → AME: anterior median eyes → DTA: dorsal tegular apophysis,  on the back of the  DTiA: dorsal tibial apophysis,  on the back of a  LTA: lateral tegular apophysis, apophysis on the side of the  MOQ: median ocular quadrangle, the quadrangle formed by the four median eyes, → PLE: posterior lateral eyes →  PLS: posterior lateral spinnerets → PME: posterior median eyes →  PMS: posterior median spinnerets → RCF: retrolateral cymbial fold, fold on the  surface of the RTA: retrolateral tibial apophysis,  on the  surface of a VTA: ventral tegular apophysis,  on the underside of the  VTiA''': ventral tibial apophysis,  on the lower surface of a

See also
 Spider anatomy
 Glossary of entomology terms
 Anatomical terms of location

References

Bibliography

 
Spider terms
Wikipedia glossaries using unordered lists